Giorgio Furlan (born 9 March 1966 in Treviso) is an Italian former road bicycle racer, who currently works as a directeur sportif for UCI Continental team .

Major results

1986
 1st Stage 4 Tour de Luxembourg
1990
 1st  Road race, National Road Championships
 1st Gran Premio Città di Camaiore
1991
 1st Coppa Bernocchi
1992
 1st  Overall Tour de Suisse
1st Stage 2
 1st Giro di Toscana
 1st La Flèche Wallonne
 1st Stage 2 Critérium International
 1st Stage 14 Giro d'Italia
1993
 1st Stage 9 Giro d'Italia
 1st Stage 2 Tour de Suisse
1994
 1st  Overall Critérium International
1st Stage 2
 1st  Overall Tirreno–Adriatico
1st Stages 2, 6 & 7
 1st Milan–San Remo
 1st Trofeo Pantalica
 1st Stage 2 Semaine Sicilienne
 1st Stage 2 Tour de Romandie
1995
 1st Stage 2 Tour de Suisse

References

External links

Palmarès by cyclingwebsite.net 
Palmarès by cyclingbase.com 

1966 births
Living people
Sportspeople from Treviso
Italian Giro d'Italia stage winners
Italian male cyclists
Tour de Suisse stage winners
Cyclists from the Province of Treviso